Kepez Belediyespor is a basketball club based in Kepez - Antalya, Turkey that plays in the Turkish Basketball League. They got promoted from the Second League as the runners-up in the 2006-2007 season. They finished their 2007-2008 TBL season in 11th spot with 12 wins.

The club is sponsored by Kepez Municipality.

Current roster

External links
TBLStat.net Profile 

Basketball teams in Turkey